Diabrotica is a large, widespread genus of beetles in the family Chrysomelidae. Members of this genus include several destructive agricultural pest species, sometimes referred to as cucumber beetles or corn rootworms.

Species

 Diabrotica adelpha Harold, 1875
 Diabrotica adornata Baly, 1890
 Diabrotica aegrota Baly, 1890
 Diabrotica alboplagiata Jacoby, 1882
 Diabrotica alegrensis Bechyne & Bechyne, 1962
 Diabrotica alexia Bechyne, 1956
 Diabrotica alfazema Bechyne, 1997
 Diabrotica amecameca Krysan & Smith, 1987
 Diabrotica amoena (Dalman, 1823)
 Diabrotica amoenula Boheman, 1859
 Diabrotica analis Baly, 1890
 Diabrotica antonietta Bechyne, 1956
 Diabrotica apicalis Baly, 1886
 Diabrotica apicicornis Jacoby, 1887
 Diabrotica apicipennis (Baly, 1890)
 Diabrotica aracatuba Bechyne & Bechyne, 1964
 Diabrotica arcuata Baly, 1859
 Diabrotica asignata Baly, 1890
 Diabrotica atomaria Jacoby, 1889
 Diabrotica atriceps Baly, 1890
 Diabrotica atriineata Baly, 1889
 Diabrotica atriscutata (Baly, 1890)
 Diabrotica atromaculata Baly, 1889
 Diabrotica atrosignata (Baly, 1890)
 Diabrotica bakeri (Bowditch, 1911)
 Diabrotica barberi R. Smith & Lawrence, 1967 - northern corn rootworm
 Diabrotica barclayi Derunkov, Rocha Prado, Tishechkin & Konstantinov, 2015
 Diabrotica balteata LeConte, 1865 - banded cucumber beetle
 Diabrotica bartleti Baly, 1890
 Diabrotica beniensis Krysan & Smith, 1987
 Diabrotica biannularis Harold, 1875
 Diabrotica bilineata Baly, 1890
 Diabrotica bioculata Bowditch, 1911
 Diabrotica bipartita Jacoby, 1887
 Diabrotica bipustulata Baly, 1886
 Diabrotica bisecta Baly, 1890
 Diabrotica boggianii Bowditch, 1911
 Diabrotica boliviana Harold, 1877
 Diabrotica bordoni Bechyne & Bechyne, 1969
 Diabrotica brevicornis Baly, 1890
 Diabrotica brevilineata Jacoby, 1887
 Diabrotica brevittitata Baly, 1890
 Diabrotica brunneosignata Jacoby, 1887
 Diabrotica buckleyi Baly, 1879
 Diabrotica buqueti Baly, 1889
 Diabrotica caiuba (Bechyne & Bechyne, 1969)
 Diabrotica calchaqui Cabrera & Cabrera Walsh, 2004
 Diabrotica callangaensis Bowditch, 1911
 Diabrotica carolae Krysan & Smith, 1987
 Diabrotica caveyi Derunkov, Rocha Prado, Tishechkin & Konstantinov, 2015
 Diabrotica cavicollis Baly, 1890
 Diabrotica centralis Jacoby, 1882
 Diabrotica championi Jacoby, 1887
 Diabrotica chapuisi Baly, 1886
 Diabrotica chimborensis Bowditch, 1911
 Diabrotica chloris Baly, 1890
 Diabrotica chloropus Harold, 1875
 Diabrotica chlororhoidalis Bechyne, 1958
 Diabrotica chontalensis Jacoby, 1887
 Diabrotica circulata Harold, 1875
 Diabrotica clarkellita Bowditch, 1911
 Diabrotica clarki Weise, 1916
 Diabrotica clio Bowditch, 1911
 Diabrotica columbiensis Bowditch, 1911
 Diabrotica confluenta Baly, 1890
 Diabrotica confraterna Baly, 1889
 Diabrotica confusa Bowditch, 1911
 Diabrotica consentanea Baly, 1886
 Diabrotica contigua Baly, 1889
 Diabrotica costaricensis Derunkov, Rocha Prado, Tishechkin & Konstantinov, 2015
 Diabrotica crenulata Baly, 1890
 Diabrotica cristata (Harris, 1837)
 Diabrotica cryptochlora Bechyne, 1956
 Diabrotica cryptomorpha Bechyne, 1997
 Diabrotica curvilineata Jacoby, 1887
 Diabrotica curvipustulata Baly, 1890
 Diabrotica cyaneomaculata Jacoby, 1887
 Diabrotica decaspila Baly, 1890
 Diabrotica decempunctata Latreille, 1813
 Diabrotica deliqua Weise, 1921
 Diabrotica delrio Bowditch, 1911
 Diabrotica discoidalis Baly, 1865
 Diabrotica dissimilis Jacoby, 1887
 Diabrotica distincta Jacoby, 1882
 Diabrotica diversicornis Baly, 1890
 Diabrotica dmitryogloblini Derunkov, Rocha Prado, Tishechkin & Konstantinov, 2015
 Diabrotica duckworthorum Derunkov, Rocha Prado, Tishechkin & Konstantinov, 2015
 Diabrotica duplicata Jacoby, 1887
 Diabrotica duvivieri Baly, 1886
 Diabrotica dysoni Baly, 1886
 Diabrotica egleri (Bechyne & Bechyne, 1961)
 Diabrotica elata Fabricius, 1801
 Diabrotica elegantula Baly, 1886
 Diabrotica emorsitans Baly, 1890
 Diabrotica enae Marques, 1941
 Diabrotica ephemera Bechyne, 1958
 Diabrotica eustolia Bechyne, 1958
 Diabrotica evanescens Baly, 1889
 Diabrotica exclamationis Baly, 1859
 Diabrotica extensa (Baly, 1889)
 Diabrotica facialis Baly, 1890
 Diabrotica fallaciosa Weise, 1921
 Diabrotica fallenia Bechyne, 1956
 Diabrotica fauveli (Baly, 1890)
 Diabrotica febronia Bechyne, 1958
 Diabrotica fenestralis Jacoby, 1879
 Diabrotica fidelia Bechyne, 1956
 Diabrotica firmiona Bechyne, 1958
 Diabrotica flava (Olivier, 1791)
 Diabrotica flaviventris Jacoby, 1887
 Diabrotica flavofulva Baly, 1890
 Diabrotica formosa Baly, 1886
 Diabrotica fowleri Baly, 1890
 Diabrotica freudei Bechyne, 1956
 Diabrotica fucata (Fabricius, 1787)
 Diabrotica fulveola (Baly, 1890)
 Diabrotica fulvicornis Jacoby, 1887
 Diabrotica fulvofasciata Jacoby, 1889
 Diabrotica funerea Bowditch, 1911
 Diabrotica fuscula Bowditch, 1911
 Diabrotica gahani Jacoby, 1893
 Diabrotica generosa Baly, 1879
 Diabrotica germari Baly, 1890
 Diabrotica glaucina (Baly, 1889)
 Diabrotica godmani Jacoby, 1887
 Diabrotica gorhami Baly, 1890
 Diabrotica gracilenta Erichson, 1847
 Diabrotica gracilis Jacoby, 1878
 Diabrotica graminea (Baly, 1886)
 Diabrotica gratiosa Baly, 1886
 Diabrotica grayella Baly, 1886
 Diabrotica guaira Bechyne, 1958
 Diabrotica guaratiba (Marques, 1941)
 Diabrotica gudula Bechyne, 1956
 Diabrotica guttifera Baly, 1889
 Diabrotica haroldi Baly, 1886
 Diabrotica hartjei Derunkov, Rocha Prado, Tishechkin & Konstantinov, 2015
 Diabrotica hathawayi Marques, 1941
 Diabrotica helga Bechyne, 1956
 Diabrotica hilli Krysan & Smith, 1987
 Diabrotica hogei Jacoby, 1887
 Diabrotica ianthe Baly, 1890
 Diabrotica illigeri Baly, 1889
 Diabrotica impressipennis Jacoby, 1887
 Diabrotica inaequalis Baly, 1886
 Diabrotica inornata Weise, 1921
 Diabrotica interrupta (Baly, 1886)
 Diabrotica iridicollis Bechyne & Bechyne, 1965
 Diabrotica isohaeta Bechyne & Bechyne, 1969
 Diabrotica jacobiana Duvivier, 1885
 Diabrotica jacobyi Baly, 1879
 Diabrotica jamaicensis Bryant, 1924
 Diabrotica jariensis Bechyne & Bechyne, 1965
 Diabrotica javeti Baly, 1889
 Diabrotica josephbalyi Derunkov, Rocha Prado, Tishechkin & Konstantinov, 2015
 Diabrotica kirbyi Baly, 1890
 Diabrotica klugii Baly, 1886
 Diabrotica kraatzi Baly, 1890
 Diabrotica labiata Baly, 1886
 Diabrotica lacordairei (Kirsch, 1883)
 Diabrotica lamiina (Bechyne & Bechyne, 1969)
 Diabrotica latevittata (Baly, 1886)
 Diabrotica lawrencei Derunkov, Rocha Prado, Tishechkin & Konstantinov, 2015
 Diabrotica lebasii Baly, 1886
 Diabrotica lemniscata LeConte, 1868
 Diabrotica liberata Bechyne, 1958
 Diabrotica liciens (Fabricius, 1801)
 Diabrotica limitata (Sahlberg, 1823)
 Diabrotica linensis Bechyne, 1956
 Diabrotica linsleyi Krysan & Smith, 1987
 Diabrotica longicornis (Say, 1824)
 Diabrotica luciana (Blake, 1965)
 Diabrotica lucifera Erichson, 1847
 Diabrotica luederwaldti (Bowditch, 1911)
 Diabrotica lundi Smith & Lawrence, 1967
 Diabrotica luteopustulata Baly, 1890
 Diabrotica lutescens Baly, 1890
 Diabrotica macrina Bechyne, 1958
 Diabrotica manaensis (Weise, 1921)
 Diabrotica mantillerii Derunkov, Rocha Prado, Tishechkin & Konstantinov, 2015
 Diabrotica mapiriensis Bowditch, 1911
 Diabrotica marsila Bechyne, 1956
 Diabrotica martinjacobyi Derunkov, Rocha Prado, Tishechkin & Konstantinov, 2015
 Diabrotica matina Bechyne, 1958
 Diabrotica mauliki Barber, 1947
 Diabrotica mediofasciata Baly, 1890
 Diabrotica melanopa Erichson, 1847
 Diabrotica melanopyga Baly, 1889
 Diabrotica meyeri Baly, 1890
 Diabrotica milleri Krysan & Smith, 1987
 Diabrotica minuta Jacoby, 1879
 Diabrotica mitteri Derunkov, Rocha Prado, Tishechkin & Konstantinov, 2015
 Diabrotica modesta (Fabricius, 1801)
 Diabrotica morosa Jacoby, 1887
 Diabrotica moseri Weise, 1921
 Diabrotica munda (Weise, 1921)
 Diabrotica mutabilis Baly, 1886
 Diabrotica myrna Bechyne, 1956
 Diabrotica neolineata Bowditch, 1911
 Diabrotica nigritarsis (Baly, 1889)
 Diabrotica nigrocincta Baly, 1886
 Diabrotica nigrolimbata Baly, 1886
 Diabrotica nigromaculata Jacoby, 1878
 Diabrotica nigroscutata Baly, 1890
 Diabrotica nigrostriata Baly, 1890
 Diabrotica nitidicollis Baly, 1889
 Diabrotica novemguttata (Weise, 1921)
 Diabrotica novemmaculata Jacoby, 1878
 Diabrotica nummularis Harold, 1877
 Diabrotica obscura Jacoby, 1887
 Diabrotica occlusa Champion, 1920
 Diabrotica ochreata (Fabricius, 1792)
 Diabrotica octoplagiata Jacoby, 1887
 Diabrotica oculata (Baly, 1890)
 Diabrotica olivacea Jacoby, 1882
 Diabrotica olivieri Jacoby, 1887
 Diabrotica orthocosta (Bechyne & Bechyne, 1969)
 Diabrotica pachitensis Bowditch, 1911
 Diabrotica palpalis Jacoby, 1887
 Diabrotica panamensis Jacoby, 1887
 Diabrotica panchroma Bechyne, 1955
 Diabrotica paradoxa Jacoby, 1887
 Diabrotica paranaensis Marques, 1941
 Diabrotica parintinsensis (Bechyne & Bechyne, 1969)
 Diabrotica pascoei Baly, 1879
 Diabrotica paula (Bechyne & Bechyne, 1962)
 Diabrotica pauperata (Baly, 1890)
 Diabrotica peckii Bowditch, 1911
 Diabrotica periscopica Bechyne, 1958
 Diabrotica perkinsi Derunkov, Rocha Prado, Tishechkin & Konstantinov, 2015
 Diabrotica piceicornis Baly, 1889
 Diabrotica piceolimbata (Baly, 1890)
 Diabrotica piceomarginata (Baly, 1890)
 Diabrotica piceonotata Jacoby, 1887
 Diabrotica piceopicta (Baly, 1890)
 Diabrotica piceopunctata Bowditch, 1911
 Diabrotica piceosignata Baly, 1890
 Diabrotica platysoma Bechyne, 1956
 Diabrotica plaumanni Bechyne, 1954
 Diabrotica plebeja Weise, 1921
 Diabrotica poeclienta Bechyne, 1958
 Diabrotica porracea Harold, 1875
 Diabrotica praeusta (Weise, 1921)
 Diabrotica propylaea (Bechyne & Bechyne, 1969)
 Diabrotica prostigma Bechyne, 1958
 Diabrotica proximans (Baly, 1890)
 Diabrotica pulchella (Jacquelin-Val, 1856)
 Diabrotica pulchra (Sahlberg, 1823)
 Diabrotica purpurascens Bowditch, 1911
 Diabrotica pygidialis Jacoby, 1887
 Diabrotica quadricollis (Jacoby, 1887)
 Diabrotica ramona Bechyne, 1956
 Diabrotica recki Marques, 1941
 Diabrotica redfordae Derunkov, Rocha Prado, Tishechkin & Konstantinov, 2015
 Diabrotica reedi (Baly, 1890)
 Diabrotica regalis (Baly, 1859)
 Diabrotica regularis Jacoby, 1887
 Diabrotica relicta Suffrian, 1867
 Diabrotica rendalli Bowditch, 1911
 Diabrotica reysmithi Derunkov, Rocha Prado, Tishechkin & Konstantinov, 2015
 Diabrotica rogersi Jacoby, 1887
 Diabrotica rosenbergi Bowditch, 1911
 Diabrotica rufolimbata Baly, 1879
 Diabrotica rufomaculata Jacoby, 1887
 Diabrotica rufopustulata Bowditch, 1911
 Diabrotica salvadorensis Derunkov, Rocha Prado, Tishechkin & Konstantinov, 2015
 Diabrotica samouella Bechyne, 1956
 Diabrotica sancatarina Bowditch, 1911
 Diabrotica sanguinicollis Jacoby, 1879
 Diabrotica schaufussi Baly, 1890
 Diabrotica scripta Olivier, 1808
 Diabrotica scutellata Jacoby, 1887
 Diabrotica sebaldia Bechyne, 1956
 Diabrotica sedata Baly, 1890
 Diabrotica sel Derunkov, Rocha Prado, Tishechkin & Konstantinov, 2015
 Diabrotica selecta Jacoby, 1887
 Diabrotica semicirculata Jacoby, 1887
 Diabrotica semiflava Jacoby, 1887
 Diabrotica semisulcata Bowditch, 1911
 Diabrotica septemliturata Erichson, 1847
 Diabrotica septemplagiata Bowditch, 1911
 Diabrotica serrozulensis (Bechyne & Bechyne, 1962)
 Diabrotica sesquilineata Erichson, 1847
 Diabrotica sexmaculata Baly, 1879
 Diabrotica sharpii Kirsch, 1883
 Diabrotica sheba Bechyne, 1958
 Diabrotica signaticornis Chevrolat, 1844
 Diabrotica signifera Jacoby, 1887
 Diabrotica silvai Marques, 1941
 Diabrotica simulata (Baly, 1890)
 Diabrotica sinuata Olivier, 1789
 Diabrotica songoensis Bowditch, 1911
 Diabrotica spangleri Derunkov, Rocha Prado, Tishechkin & Konstantinov, 2015
 Diabrotica speciosa (Germar, 1824) - cucurbit beetle
 Diabrotica speciosissima Baly, 1879
 Diabrotica spilota Baly, 1890
 Diabrotica sublimbata (Baly, 1865)
 Diabrotica submarginata (Baly, 1890)
 Diabrotica subrugosa (Gahan, 1891)
 Diabrotica subsulcata Baly, 1865
 Diabrotica surinamensis Bowditch, 1911
 Diabrotica synoptica Bechyne, 1956
 Diabrotica tarsalis Harold, 1875
 Diabrotica teresa Bechyne, 1956
 Diabrotica terminalis Jacoby, 1879
 Diabrotica tessellata Jacoby, 1887
 Diabrotica testaceicollis (Baly, 1890)
 Diabrotica tibialis Jacoby, 1887
 Diabrotica tijuquensis Marques, 1941
 Diabrotica tortuosa Jacoby, 1887
 Diabrotica transversa Baly, 1890
 Diabrotica travassosi Marques, 1941
 Diabrotica tricolor Jacoby, 1887
 Diabrotica trifasciata Fabricius, 1801
 Diabrotica trifoveolata (Baly, 1890)
 Diabrotica trifurcata Jacoby, 1887
 Diabrotica triphonia Bechyne, 1958
 Diabrotica tropica (Weise, 1921)
 Diabrotica tumidicornis Erichson, 1847
 Diabrotica undecimpunctata Mannerheim, 1843 - spotted cucumber beetle, southern corn rootworm, western cucumber beetle, western spotted cucumber beetle
 Diabrotica underwoodi Bowditch, 1911
 Diabrotica unipunctata Jacoby, 1882
 Diabrotica univittata Jacoby, 1899
 Diabrotica utingae Marques, 1941
 Diabrotica vagrans Baly, 1889
 Diabrotica varicornis Jacoby, 1889
 Diabrotica variegata (Jacoby, 1887)
 Diabrotica venancia Bechyne, 1958
 Diabrotica venezuelensis Jacoby, 1882
 Diabrotica vilaolivae Bechyne & Bechyne, 1969
 Diabrotica virescens Baly, 1886
 Diabrotica virgifera LeConte, 1858 - Mexican corn rootworm, western corn rootworm
 Diabrotica viridana Baly, 1886
 Diabrotica viridans (Baly, 1889)
 Diabrotica viridicollis Jacoby, 1887
 Diabrotica viridifasciata Jacoby, 1887
 Diabrotica viridilimbata Baly, 1879
 Diabrotica viridimaculata Jacoby, 1878
 Diabrotica viridipustulata Baly, 1886
 Diabrotica viridula Fabricius, 1801
 Diabrotica waltersi Derunkov, Rocha Prado, Tishechkin & Konstantinov, 2015
 Diabrotica weisei Baly, 1890
 Diabrotica westwoodi (Baly, 1889)
 Diabrotica zikani Bechyne, 1968
 Diabrotica zischkai Bechyne, 1956

References

External links 

 Diabrotica balteata on the UF / IFAS Featured Creatures Web site
 Diabrotica undecimpunctata howardi on the UF / IFAS Featured Creatures website.

Galerucinae
Agricultural pest insects
Taxa named by Louis Alexandre Auguste Chevrolat
Chrysomelidae genera